Rusalsko is a village located in Ardino Municipality, Kardzhali Province, Bulgaria.

References

Villages in Kardzhali Province